Richard Arlen "Bud" Marshall (September 12, 1941 – July 16, 2009) was an American football defensive lineman in the National Football League for the Green Bay Packers, Atlanta Falcons, and Washington Redskins.  He also played in the American Football League for the Houston Oilers.  Marshall played college football at Baylor University and Stephen F. Austin State University and was drafted in the tenth round of the 1965 NFL Draft.

Marshall died on July 16, 2009, five years to the day after suffering a hemorrhagic stroke.

References

External links
Panola (TX) Watchman obituaries

1941 births
2009 deaths
People from Carthage, Texas
Players of American football from Texas
American football defensive tackles
American football defensive ends
Baylor Bears football players
Stephen F. Austin Lumberjacks football players
Green Bay Packers players
Atlanta Falcons players
Washington Redskins players
Houston Oilers players
American Football League players